So Fresh: The Hits of Autumn 2007 is a compilation of the latest songs that were popular in Australia. It was released on 26 March 2007. The CD artwork was created by Dónall at Campbell Murray Creating. The CD thanks Denis Handlin, Tony Glover, Gill Robert, Casandra Tennant-Pascoe (Sony BMG Music Entertainment Australia)

Track listing
 Gwen Stefani – "Wind It Up" (3:10)
 Damien Leith – "Night of My Life" (3:32)
 Nelly Furtado – "Say It Right" (3:34)
 Fall Out Boy – "This Ain't a Scene, It's an Arms Race" (3:32)
 The Killers – "Bones" (3:46)
 The Fray – "How to Save a Life" (4:21)
 Shannon Noll and Natalie Bassingthwaighte – "Don't Give Up" (4:40)
 Fergie featuring will.i.am – "Fergalicious" (4:53)
 Pink – "Nobody Knows" (3:56)
 Scissor Sisters – "She's My Man" (4:02)
 Snow Patrol – "Hands Open" (3:15)
 JoJo – "Too Little Too Late" (3:39)
 Paula DeAnda featuring The D.E.Y. – "Walk Away (Remember Me)" (4:20)
 The Pussycat Dolls featuring Timbaland – "Wait a Minute" (3:42)
 Guy Sebastian – "Elevator Love" (3:39)
 Stephanie McIntosh – "So Do I Say Sorry First?" (3:00)
 Take That – "Patience" (3:19)
 Anthony Callea – "Addicted to You" (3:32)
 Evanescence – "Lithium" (3:42)
 Teddy Geiger – "These Walls" (3:41)
"How to Save a Life" by The Fray is also featured on So Fresh: The Hits of Summer 2007.

Certifications

See also
2007 in music

References

External links
 Latest Albums from So Fresh

So Fresh albums
2007 compilation albums
2007 in Australian music